Roger Tumoana Leon Doom (15 February 1935 - 16 September 2016) was a French Polynesian politician who served as President of the Assembly of French Polynesia from March 1987 to May 1988.

Doom was born in Papeete and worked as a school principal. He was the first mayor of the associated commune of Vairao in Taiarapu-Ouest from 1972 to 2002. He was also a member of the Assembly of French Polynesia from 1972 to 2007, and its president from 12 March 1987 to 10 May 1988.

In June 2000 he was appointed an Officer of the Order of Tahiti Nui.

In March 2015 he was made a knight of the Order of Agricultural Merit.

References

1935 births
2016 deaths
People from Papeete
Mayors of places in French Polynesia
Members of the Assembly of French Polynesia
Speakers of the Assembly of French Polynesia
Knights of the Order of Agricultural Merit
Officers of the Order of Tahiti Nui